The 2008 Missouri elections took place on November 4, 2008

President 
This was the closest race in the 2008 Presidential Election

House of Representatives

Governor 
Even as Barack Obama lost the state, Jay Nixon won by a considerably large margin

Lieutenant Governor

Secretary of State

State Treasurer

Attorney General

References

 
Missouri